The logistic map is a polynomial mapping (equivalently, recurrence relation) of degree 2, often referred to as an archetypal example of how complex, chaotic behaviour can arise from very simple nonlinear dynamical equations. The map was popularized in a 1976 paper by the biologist Robert May, in part as a discrete-time demographic model analogous to the logistic equation written down by Pierre François Verhulst.
Mathematically, the logistic map is written

where  is a number between zero and one, which represents the ratio of existing population to the maximum possible population. 
This nonlinear difference equation is intended to capture two effects:
 reproduction, where the population will increase at a rate proportional to the current population when the population size is small,
 starvation (density-dependent mortality), where the growth rate will decrease at a rate proportional to the value obtained by taking the theoretical "carrying capacity" of the environment less the current population.

The  case of the logistic map is a nonlinear transformation of both the bit-shift map and the  case of the tent map. If , this leads to negative population sizes. (This problem does not appear in the older Ricker model, which also exhibits chaotic dynamics.)

Characteristics of the map

Behavior dependent on 
The image below shows the amplitude and frequency content of some logistic map iterates for parameter values ranging from 2 to 4.

By varying the parameter , the following behavior is observed:

With  between 0 and 1, the population will eventually die, independent of the initial population.
 With  between 1 and 2, the population will quickly approach the value , independent of the initial population.
 With  between 2 and 3, the population will also eventually approach the same value , but first will fluctuate around that value for some time.
 With  between 3 and 1 +  ≈ 3.44949 the population will approach permanent oscillations between two values.
 With  between 3.44949 and 3.54409 (approximately), from almost all initial conditions the population will approach permanent oscillations among four values. The latter number is a root of a 12th degree polynomial .
 With  increasing beyond 3.54409, from almost all initial conditions the population will approach oscillations among 8 values, then 16, 32, etc. The lengths of the parameter intervals that yield oscillations of a given length decrease rapidly;  the ratio between the lengths of two successive bifurcation intervals approaches the Feigenbaum constant . This behavior is an example of a period-doubling cascade.
 At   is the onset of chaos, at the end of the period-doubling cascade. From almost all initial conditions, we no longer see oscillations of finite period.  Slight variations in the initial population yield dramatically different results over time, a prime characteristic of chaos.
 Most values of  beyond 3.56995 exhibit chaotic behaviour, but there are still certain isolated ranges of  that show non-chaotic behavior; these are sometimes called islands of stability. For instance, beginning at 1 +  (approximately 3.82843) there is a range of parameters  that show oscillation among three values, and for slightly higher values of  oscillation among 6 values, then 12 etc.
 The development of the chaotic behavior of the logistic sequence as the parameter  varies from approximately 3.56995 to approximately 3.82843 is sometimes called the Pomeau–Manneville scenario, characterized by a periodic (laminar) phase interrupted by bursts of aperiodic behavior. Such a scenario has an application in semiconductor devices. A period-doubling window with parameter  is a range of -values consisting of a succession of subranges. This sequence of sub-ranges is called a cascade of harmonics. In a sub-range with a stable cycle of period , there are unstable cycles of period  for all . The  value at the end of the infinite sequence of sub-ranges is called the point of accumulation of the cascade of harmonics. As  rises there is a succession of new windows with different  values.
 Beyond , almost all initial values eventually leave the interval  and diverge. The set of initial conditions which remain within  form a Cantor set and the dynamics restricted to this Cantor set is chaotic.

For any value of  there is at most one stable cycle. If a stable cycle exists, it is globally stable,  attracting almost all points.

The bifurcation diagram at right summarizes this. The horizontal axis shows the possible values of the parameter  while the vertical axis shows the set of values of  visited asymptotically from almost all initial conditions by the iterates of the logistic equation with that  value.

The bifurcation diagram is a self-similar: if we zoom in on the above-mentioned value  and focus on one arm of the three, the situation nearby looks like a shrunk and slightly distorted version of the whole diagram. The same is true for all other non-chaotic points. This is an example of the deep and ubiquitous connection between chaos and fractals.

We can also consider negative values of :
 For  between -2 and -1 the logistic sequence also features chaotic behavior.

Chaos and the logistic map

The relative simplicity of the logistic map makes it a widely used point of entry into a consideration of the concept of chaos. A common source of such sensitivity to initial conditions is that the map represents a repeated folding and stretching of the space on which it is defined. In the case of the logistic map, the quadratic difference equation describing it may be thought of as a stretching-and-folding operation on the interval .

The following figure illustrates the stretching and folding over a sequence of iterates of the map. However, we can embed the same sequence in a three-dimensional state space, in order to investigate the deeper structure of the map. Figure (b), right, demonstrates this, showing how initially nearby points begin to diverge, particularly in those regions of  corresponding to the steeper sections of the plot.

This stretching-and-folding does not just produce a gradual divergence of the sequences of iterates, but an exponential divergence (see Lyapunov exponents), evidenced also by the complexity and unpredictability of the chaotic logistic map.  In fact, exponential divergence of sequences of iterates explains the connection between chaos and unpredictability: a small error in the supposed initial state of the system will tend to correspond to a large error later in its evolution.  Hence, predictions about future states become progressively (indeed, exponentially) worse when there are even very small errors in our knowledge of the initial state. This quality of unpredictability and apparent randomness led the logistic map equation to be used as a pseudo-random number generator in early computers.

Since the map is confined to an interval on the real number line, its dimension is less than or equal to unity. Note: It can be shown that the correlation dimension is certainly between 0.4926 and 0.5024.

It is often possible, however, to make precise and accurate statements about the likelihood of a future state in a chaotic system. If a (possibly chaotic) dynamical system has an attractor, then there exists a probability measure that gives the long-run proportion of time spent by the system in the various regions of the attractor. Specifically, the invariant measure is

Unpredictability is not randomness, but in some circumstances looks very much like it.  Hence, and fortunately, even if we know very little about the initial state of the logistic map (or some other chaotic system), we can still say something about the distribution of states arbitrarily far into the future, and use this knowledge to inform decisions based on the state of the system.

Graphical representation 
The Bifurcation diagram for the logistic map can be visualized with the following Python code:import numpy as np
import matplotlib.pyplot as plt

interval = (2.8, 4)  # start, end
accuracy = 0.0001
reps = 600  # number of repetitions
numtoplot = 200
lims = np.zeros(reps)

fig, biax = plt.subplots()
fig.set_size_inches(16, 9)

lims[0] = np.random.rand()
for r in np.arange(interval[0], interval[1], accuracy):
    for i in range(reps-1):
        lims[i+1] = r*lims[i]*(1-lims[i])

    biax.plot([r]*numtoplot, lims[reps-numtoplot:], 'b.', markersize=.02)

biax.set(xlabel='r', ylabel='x', title='logistic map')
plt.show()

Special cases of the map

Upper bound when 
Although exact solutions to the recurrence relation are only available in a small number of cases, a closed-form upper bound on the logistic map is known when . There are two aspects of the behavior of the logistic map that should be captured by an upper bound in this regime: the asymptotic geometric decay with constant , and the fast initial decay when  is close to 1, driven by the  term in the recurrence relation. The following bound captures both of these effects:

Solution when 
The solution when  is,

where the initial condition parameter  is given by

For rational , after a finite number of iterations  maps into a periodic sequence.  But almost all  are irrational, and, for irrational ,  never repeats itself – it is non-periodic.  This solution equation clearly demonstrates the two key features of chaos – stretching and folding: the factor  shows the exponential growth of stretching, which results in sensitive dependence on initial conditions, while the squared sine function keeps  folded within the range .

For  an equivalent solution in terms of complex numbers instead of trigonometric functions is

where  is either of the complex numbers

with modulus equal to 1.

By contrast, the solution when  is

Since  for any value of  other than the unstable fixed point 0, the term  goes to 0 as  goes to infinity, so  goes to the stable fixed point .

Finding cycles of any length when 
For the  case, from almost all initial conditions the iterate sequence is chaotic.  Nevertheless, there exist an infinite number of initial conditions that lead to cycles, and indeed there exist cycles of length  for all integers .  We can exploit the relationship of the logistic map to the dyadic transformation (also known as the bit-shift map) to find cycles of any length.  If  follows the logistic map  and  follows the dyadic transformation

then the two are related by a homeomorphism

The reason that the dyadic transformation is also called the bit-shift map is that when  is written in binary notation, the map moves the binary point one place to the right (and if the bit to the left of the binary point has become a "1", this "1" is changed to a "0").  A cycle of length 3, for example, occurs if an iterate has a 3-bit repeating sequence in its binary expansion (which is not also a one-bit repeating sequence): 001, 010, 100, 110, 101, or 011. The iterate 001001001... maps into 010010010..., which maps into 100100100..., which in turn maps into the original 001001001...; so this is a 3-cycle of the bit shift map.  And the other three binary-expansion repeating sequences give the 3-cycle 110110110... → 101101101... → 011011011... → 110110110....  Either of these 3-cycles can be converted to fraction form: for example, the first-given 3-cycle can be written as  →  →  → .  Using the above translation from the bit-shift map to the  logistic map gives the corresponding logistic cycle 0.611260467... → 0.950484434... → 0.188255099... → 0.611260467....  We could similarly translate the other bit-shift 3-cycle into its corresponding logistic cycle.  Likewise, cycles of any length  can be found in the bit-shift map and then translated into the corresponding logistic cycles.

This is one way to see that the logistic  map is chaotic for almost all initial conditions.

This tells us that the logistic map with  has 2 fixed points, 1 cycle of length 2, 2 cycles of length 3 and so on. This sequence takes a particularly simple form for prime : . For example: 2 ⋅  = 630 is the number of cycles of length 13. Since this case of the logistic map is chaotic for almost all initial conditions, all of these finite-length cycles are unstable.

Related concepts

Feigenbaum universality of 1-D maps
Universality of one-dimensional maps with parabolic maxima  and Feigenbaum constants ,   is well visible with map proposed as a toy 
model for discrete laser dynamics: 
,
where  stands for electric field amplitude,  is laser gain as bifurcation parameter. 

See also 
 Logistic function, solution of the logistic map's continuous counterpart: the Logistic differential equation.
 Lyapunov stability#Definition for discrete-time systems 
 Malthusian growth model
 Periodic points of complex quadratic mappings, of which the logistic map is a special case confined to the real line
 Radial basis function network, which illustrates the inverse problem for the logistic map.
 Schröder's equation
 Stiff equation

Notes

References

External links

 The Chaos Hypertextbook. An introductory primer on chaos and fractals.
 An interactive visualization of the logistic map as a Jupyter notebook
 The Logistic Map and Chaos by Elmer G. Wiens
 Complexity & Chaos (audiobook) by Roger White. Chapter 5 covers the Logistic Equation.
 "History of iterated maps," in A New Kind of Science by Stephen Wolfram. Champaign, IL: Wolfram Media, p. 918, 2002.
 "A very brief history of universality in period doubling" by P. Cvitanović
 "A not so short history of Universal Function"  by P. Cvitanović
 Discrete Logistic Equation by Marek Bodnar after work by Phil Ramsden, Wolfram Demonstrations Project.
 Multiplicative coupling of 2 logistic maps by C. Pellicer-Lostao and R. Lopez-Ruiz after work by Ed Pegg Jr, Wolfram Demonstrations Project.
 Using SAGE to investigate the discrete logistic equation

Chaotic maps